Buster is a nickname of:

Actors
William Collier Jr. (1902–1987), American actor
Buster Crabbe (1908–1983), American actor and athlete
Buster Keaton (1895–1966), American actor, filmmaker, producer and writer
Buster Merryfield (1920–1999), English actor most famous for his portrayal of 'Uncle' Albert Trotter in the sitcom Only Fools and Horses

Musicians and singers
Buster Bailey (1902–1967), American jazz musician
Buster Bennett (1914–1980), American blues saxophonist and vocalist
Buster Benton (1932–1996), American blues guitarist and singer
Buster Brown (musician) (1911–1976), American R&B singer and musician
Buster Cooper (1929–2016), American jazz trombonist
Buster Harding (1917–1965), Canadian jazz pianist, composer and arranger
Buster Meikle, singer and guitarist, formerly with Unit 4 + 2 and Buster & Bill
Buster Smith (1904–1991), American jazz musician
Buster Williams (born 1942), jazz bass player
Buster Wilson (1897–1949), American jazz pianist

In sports
Buster Bishop (1920–2004), American college golf coach
Buster Brown (baseball) (1881–1914), American Major League Baseball pitcher
Jack Craigie (1913–1994), Australian rugby league footballer 
Buster Cupit (born 1927), American retired golfer
Buster Douglas (born 1960), American heavyweight boxer
Ángel Figueroa (born 1981), Puerto Rican basketball player
Lou Gehrig (1903–1941), American Hall of Fame Major League Baseball player
Buster Millerick (1905–1986), American Hall of Fame racehorse trainer
Buster Mottram (born 1955), English tennis player
Buster Narum (1940–2004), American Major League Baseball pitcher
Buster Nupen (1902–1977), South African cricketer
Buster Olney (born 1964), sports journalist
Buster Posey (born 1987), Major League Baseball catcher and first baseman
Buster Ramsey (1920–2007), American college football player and National Football League player and head coach
Buster Rhymes (born 1962), American retired National Football League wide receiver
Buster Skrine (born 1989), American National Football League player
Vern Stephens (1920–1968), American Major League Baseball player
Phil Tomney (1862–1892), American baseball player
Luke "Buster" Watson (born 1957), British sprinter

Other
Geoffrey Bailey (1899–1929 or later), English First World War flying ace
Francis William Beaumont (1903–1941), heir to the Seigneur of Sark, Royal Air Force officer and film producer
Buster Edwards (1931–1994), member of the gang that perpetrated the Great Train Robbery
Buster Lloyd-Jones (1914–1980), British veterinarian
Buster Martin, who claimed to be the oldest employee in the UK
Lionel Crabb (1909–c. 1956), British Royal Navy and MI6 diver

See also 

 
 

Lists of people by nickname